Epidelia is a genus of snout moths. It was described by Ragonot in 1891, and contains the species E. viridalis. It is found in Panama.

References

Chrysauginae
Monotypic moth genera
Moths of Central America
Pyralidae genera